Terry Van Gijn-Sibbing (born 20 December 1963, Hendrik-Ido-Ambacht) is a former Dutch field hockey player, who earned a total number of 81 caps in the 1980s for the Dutch women's team, in which she scored four goals. She was a member of the squad that won the inaugural Women's Champions Trophy in 1987.

References
  Dutch Hockey Federation

1963 births
Living people
Dutch female field hockey players
Sportspeople from Hendrik-Ido-Ambacht
20th-century Dutch women
20th-century Dutch people